Nampula Airport is an airport in Nampula, Mozambique . In the northeastern part of Mozambique, with two paved runways.

Airlines and destinations

Statistics

References

External links
Mozambique Airport Authority

Airports in Mozambique
Buildings and structures in Nampula